Ç or ç (C-cedilla) is a Latin script letter, used in the Albanian, Azerbaijani, Manx, Tatar, Turkish, Turkmen, Kurdish, Kazakh, and Romance alphabets. Romance languages that use this letter include Catalan, French, Giuliani, Silurian, Occidental, and Portuguese as a variant of the letter C with a cedilla. It is also occasionally used in Crimean Tatar and in Tajikistan (when written in the Latin script) to represent the  sound. It is often retained in the spelling of loanwords from any of these languages in English, Basque, Dutch, Spanish and other languages using the Latin alphabet.

It was first used for the sound of the voiceless alveolar affricate  in Old Spanish and stems from the Visigothic form of the letter z (Ꝣ). Later,  changed into  in many Romance languages and dialects. Spanish has not used the symbol since an orthographic reform in the 18th century (which replaced ç with the now-devoiced z), but it was adopted for writing other languages.

In the International Phonetic Alphabet,  represents the voiceless palatal fricative.

Usage as a letter variant in various languages

In many languages,  represents the "soft" sound  where a  would normally represent the "hard" sound . These include:
Catalan. A well-known word with this character is Barça, a common Catalan clipping of Futbol Club Barcelona.
French (cé cédille): français ('French'), garçon ('boy'), façade ('frontage'), grinçant ('squeaking'), leçon ('lesson'), reçu ('received' [past participle]). French does not use the character at the end of a word but it can occur at the beginning of a word (e.g., ça, 'that'). It is never used in French where C would denote /s/ (before e,i,y ) nor before h.
Occitan (ce cedilha): torçut ('twisted'), çò ('this'), ça que la ('nevertheless'), braç ('arm'), brèç ('cradle'), voraç ('voracious'). It can occur at the beginning of a word.
Modern Portuguese does not use the character at the beginning or at the end of a word (the nickname for Conceição is São, not Ção). According to a Portuguese grammar written in 1550, the letter ç had the sound of /dz/ around that time. Another grammar written around 1700 would say that the letter ç sounds like /s/, which shows a phonetic evolution that is still valid today.
Old Spanish used ç to represent /t͡s/ before /a/, /o/, /u/. It also represented /d͡z/ allophonically when it occurred before a voiced consonant.
Early Modern Spanish used the letter ç to represent either /θ/ or /s/ before /a/, /o/, and /u/ in much the same way as Modern Spanish uses the letter z. Middle Castilian Spanish pronounced ç as /θ/, or as /ð/ before a voiced consonant. Andalusian, Canarian, and Latin American Spanish pronounced ç as /s/, or as /z/ before a voiced consonant. A spelling reform in the 18th century eliminated ç from Spanish orthography.

In other languages, it represents the voiceless postalveolar affricate  (like  in English chalk):

In Manx, it is used in the digraph , which also represents , to differentiate it from normal , which represents .

In loanwords only
In Basque,  (known as ze hautsia) is used in the loanword Curaçao.
In Dutch, it can be found in some words from French and Portuguese, such as façade, reçu, Provençaals and Curaçao.
In English,  is used in loanwords such as façade and limaçon (although the cedilla mark is often dropped:).

Usage as a separate letter in various languages
It represents the voiceless postalveolar affricate  in the following languages:

the 4th letter of the Albanian alphabet.
the 4th letter of the Azerbaijani alphabet.
the 4th letter of the Turkish alphabet.
the 3rd letter of the Turkmen alphabet.
the 4th letter of the Kurmanji alphabet (also known as Northern Kurdish).
the 4th letter of the Zazaki alphabet.

In Tatar, ç represents .

It also represents the retroflex flap  in the Rohingya Latin alphabet.

Janalif uses this letter to represent the voiced postalveolar affricate 

Computer

Input

On Albanian, Belgian, French, Portuguese, Spanish, Turkish and Italian keyboards,  is directly available as a separate key; however, on most other keyboards, including the US and British keyboard, a combination of keys must be used:

The HTML character entity references are &ccedil; and &Ccedil; for lower- and uppercase, respectively.
In TeX and LaTeX, \c is used for adding the cedilla accent to a letter, so \c{c} produces "ç".

See also
Ҹ

References

C-cedilla
Phonetic transcription symbols
Polish letters with diacritics